Tamil Nadu Medical Services Corporation Limited (TNMSC) is a state-government undertaking of Government of Tamil Nadu located in the Indian state of Tamil Nadu. The TNMSC was incorporated under the Companies Act, 1956 on 1 July 1994.

Functions of TNMSC

 Procurement, Testing, Storage and Distribution of Drugs, Medicines, Surgicals & Sutures, Kits, Reagents to the Tamil Nadu Government Medical Institutions & Hospitals (   Human / Veterinary  )
 Procurement, Testing, Storage and Distribution of Medical Equipments and Instruments to the Tamil Nadu Government Medical Institutions & Hospitals (    Human / Veterinary   )
 Operate 51 CT Scans Centres (X-ray computed tomography), 64 Slice CT Scan Centers, 8 M.R.I Scans Centre (Magnetic resonance imaging), 2 Lithotripsy Centre, 7 Regional Diagnostic Centres (offers 68 different Diagnostic lab tests) and Master Health Checkup Centers at Tamil Nadu Government Medical Institutions & Hospitals
 Operate Pay Wards (offers Special Class Maternity Wards in Government Kasthurba Gandhi Hospital, Government Hospital and Government General Hospital in Chennai)
 Operate Institute of Obstetrics and Gynaecology
 Operate GI Bleed and Hepatobiliary Centre at Government Stanley Hospital, Chennai
 Operates a special Sale Counter at Government Medical College Hospital, Kilpauk, Chennai for a sale of life saving drugs to the Public at rates much lesser than the market rate
 Operate warehouses at 25 district headquarters

References

External links 
 TNMSC Official Site
 

State agencies of Tamil Nadu
Companies based in Chennai
Health care companies of India
Health in Tamil Nadu
Indian companies established in 1994
Health care companies established in 1994
1994 establishments in Tamil Nadu